JT Mollner is an American film director, film producer, screenwriter, entrepreneur, and former actor best known for his feature film directorial debut Outlaws and Angels. The film earned accolades at Sundance in 2016 for Mollner's use of Kodak film stock and vintage Panavision cameras and lenses. Mollner is also known for starring in the Las Vegas stage production of Tony n' Tina's Wedding, and he is heir to the Freakling Brothers haunted houses in Las Vegas, NV.

Early life
JT was born in Las Vegas to Ginnie, a former singer, and Duke Mollner, a former dancer. The two met while working at the Dunes during the Rat Pack era of the 1960s, where Duke later became a card dealer. JT has an older brother named Daniel Mollner. In 1976, Duke and Daniel began operating a haunted house from their home on East Rochelle Avenue in southeast Las Vegas that grew in popularity. By age five, JT had been inducted into the cast. He told a reporter in 2015 that "It was a great household to be from, because you’re instantly the most popular kid in school.”

At an early age, Mollner was already a cinephile, with an interest in adult novels and writing. He credits his aunt Deanna Mollner, who lived in Los Angeles in the '70s and "ran around with the likes of Jack Nicholson, and Roman Polanski" for introducing him to the films of Polanski, Stanley Kubrick, and Federico Fellini. JT said in an interview that he always knew as a child he wanted to be a filmmaker, though he felt it wasn't an option for him because his older brother Daniel had already attended UCLA Film School.

Career
In 2005, after ending a year-long starring role in a stage production of Tony and Tina's Wedding at the Rio Hotel in Las Vegas, Mollner moved to Los Angeles to pursue a career in the film industry. Believing his dream to direct films was a long shot, JT did not pursue it immediately, instead taking small acting jobs to pay the bills, while writing screenplays in his spare time. Mollner soon became frustrated with acting in LA, explaining in an interview that he was tired of "being a tool in someone else's vision...having to read lines from someone else's script...[while] wanting to be doing what [the directors] are doing".

At that time, JT was looking for directors for a short film he had written, when his producing partner successfully petitioned Mollner to direct it. JT directed several commercials and music videos over the next decade, as well as writing and directing a series of short independent films, including The Red Room (2008), and Henry John and the Little Bug (2009). In 2011 Mollner directed his father Duke, and his brother Daniel in the short Sugartown, and in 2015 he wrote and directed Flowers in December starring Dee Wallace.

Outlaws and Angels
JT began writing a script for his first feature in 2010, with the intention of making a film reminiscent of 1970s westerns. Deciding to wait until he could cast well known actors, while insisting on using film stock and vintage cameras rather than shooting on conventional digital cameras, Outlaws would be in the development stage for nearly 5 years. When production finally began in 2015, JT was accompanied by cinematographer Matthew Irving, both having seen eye to eye immediately upon meeting, as they share several cinematic influences. Irving would become instrumental in providing the classic look Mollner wanted to achieve. The duo contacted Kodak about supplying VISION3 500T Color Negative Film 5219, an uncommon film type due to the grain caused by its slower speed, which served Mollner and Irving well in emulating the '70s look. The movie was shot entirely on Kodak film, using two Panaflex Platinum cameras, a Steadicam, and a variety of vintage lenses.

Outlaws and Angels premiered at the 2016 Sundance Film Festival, starring Chad Michael Murray and Francesca Eastwood, with Luke Wilson, Frances Fisher, and Teri Polo, with special appearances by Mollner's father and brother Duke and Daniel Mollner. Outlaws was featured as Sundance's midnight selection. On July 14, 2016, Outlaws appeared at the Fantasia Film Festival, and was released in theaters and VOD on July 15, 2016. Though the script was influenced by home invasion movies, and the grittier western films of the 1970s, Mollner pulled largely from the 2005 Nick Cave film The Proposition for the feel of Outlaws, borrowing a similar look of gritty teeth from an era lacking fluoride, and extra horse manure as aesthetic inspiration on set.

Filmography

Short Film

Feature Film

Personal life
JT takes three months off every year to return to Las Vegas to help run Freakling Brothers, his family's seasonal haunted house business. The company was founded in 1992, and has expanded from one haunted house in the Mollner family garage, to a mobile "Trilogy of Terror" that includes a series of three haunted houses appearing side by side every Halloween season, and is most notable for the "Gates of Hell", Las Vegas' first R-rated haunted house.

References

External links
 Mollner on Sell Your Screenplay episode 133

Living people
Male actors from Las Vegas
Writers from Las Vegas
Year of birth missing (living people)